Propan-1-ol (also propanol, n-propyl alcohol) is a primary alcohol with the formula  and sometimes represented as PrOH or n-PrOH. It is a colourless liquid and an isomer of 2-propanol. It is formed naturally in small amounts during many fermentation processes and used as a solvent in the pharmaceutical industry, mainly for resins and cellulose esters, and, sometimes, as a disinfecting agent.

Chemical properties
Propan-1-ol shows the normal reactions of a primary alcohol. Thus it can be converted to alkyl halides; for example red phosphorus and iodine produce n-propyl iodide in 80% yield, while  with catalytic  gives n-propyl chloride. Reaction with acetic acid in the presence of an  catalyst under Fischer esterification conditions gives propyl acetate, while refluxing propanol overnight with formic acid alone can produce propyl formate in 65% yield. Oxidation with chromic acid yields propionic acid.

Preparation
Propan-1-ol is manufactured by catalytic hydrogenation of propionaldehyde. Propionaldehyde is produced via the oxo process by hydroformylation of ethylene using carbon monoxide and hydrogen in the presence of a catalyst such as cobalt octacarbonyl or a rhodium complex.

A traditional laboratory preparation of propan-1-ol involves treating n-propyl iodide with moist .

Safety
Propan-1-ol is thought to be similar to ethanol in its effects on the human body, but 2–4 times more potent. Oral LD50 in rats is 1870 mg/kg (compared to 7060 mg/kg for ethanol). It is metabolized into propionic acid. Effects include alcoholic intoxication and high anion gap metabolic acidosis. As of 2011, one case of lethal propan-1-ol poisoning was reported.

Propan-1-ol as fuel
Propan-1-ol has high octane number and is suitable for engine fuel usage. However, propanol is too expensive to use as a motor fuel. The research octane number (RON) of propanol is 118, and anti-knock index (AKI) is 108.

References

Further reading

External links
 International Chemical Safety Card 0553
 NIOSH Pocket Guide to Chemical Hazards

Alkanols
Alcohol solvents
Primary alcohols
GABAA receptor positive allosteric modulators
Sedatives
Hypnotics
Propyl compounds